Finland participated in and won the Eurovision Song Contest 2006 with the song "Hard Rock Hallelujah" written by Mr Lordi. The song was performed by the band Lordi. The Finnish broadcaster Yleisradio (Yle) organised the national final Euroviisut 2006 in order to select the Finnish entry for the 2006 contest in Athens, Greece. 12 artists with two songs each were selected to compete in the national final, which consisted of four semi-finals and a final, taking place in February and March 2006. Twelve entries ultimately competed in the final on 10 March where votes from the public selected "Hard Rock Hallelujah" performed by Lordi as the winner.

Finland competed in the semi-final of the Eurovision Song Contest which took place on 18 May 2006. Performing during the show in position 16, "Hard Rock Hallelujah" was announced among the top 10 entries of the semi-final and therefore qualified to compete in the final on 20 May. This marked the first qualification to the final for Finland since the introduction of semi-finals in 2004. It was later revealed that Finland placed first out of the 23 participating countries in the semi-final with 292 points. In the final, Finland performed in position 17 and placed first out of the 24 participating countries, winning the contest with 292 points. This was Finland's first win in the Eurovision Song Contest since it began participating in 1961.

Background 

Prior to the 2006 contest, Finland had participated in the Eurovision Song Contest thirty-nine times since its first entry in 1961. Finland's best result in the contest achieved in 1973 where the song "Tom Tom Tom" performed by Marion Rung placed sixth.

The Finnish national broadcaster, Yleisradio (Yle), broadcasts the event within Finland and organises the selection process for the nation's entry. Yle confirmed their intentions to participate at the 2006 Eurovision Song Contest on 12 August 2005. Finland's entries for the Eurovision Song Contest have been selected through national final competitions that have varied in format over the years. Since 1961, a selection show that was often titled Euroviisukarsinta highlighted that the purpose of the program was to select a song for Eurovision. Along with their participation confirmation, the broadcaster announced that the Finnish entry for the 2006 contest would be selected through the Euroviisut selection show.

Before Eurovision

Euroviisut 2006 
Euroviisut 2006 was the national final that selected Finland's entry for the Eurovision Song Contest 2006. The competition consisted of five shows that commenced with the first of four semi-finals on 13 January 2006 and concluded with a final on 10 March 2006. All shows were broadcast on Yle TV2 and via radio on Yle Radio Vega. The final was also broadcast via radio on Yle Radio Suomi.

Format 
The format of the competition consisted of five shows: four semi-finals and a final. Three artists each competed with two songs in each semi-final and the winning song per act qualified to complete the twelve-song lineup in the final. The results for the semi-finals and the final were determined exclusively by a public vote. Public voting included the options of telephone and SMS voting. Prior to each of the four semi-finals, the public was able to vote in advance earlier the day each show was held.

Competing entries 
Twelve artists were directly invited by Yle to compete in the national final following consultation with record companies and presented on 7 November 2005. The entries competing in each semi-final were presented the day of the shows in weekly preview programmes on Yle Radio Suomi between 13 January 2006 and 3 February 2006. Before the final, Katariina Hänninen opted to translate her selected song "Liian aikaisin" from Finnish to English.

Shows

Semi-finals 
The four semi-final shows took place on 13 January, 20 January, 27 January and 3 February 2006 at the Tohloppi Studios in Tampere, hosted by Finnish presenters Jaana Pelkonen and Heikki Paasonen. Each of the three competing artists' winning song in each semi-final qualified to the final based on the results from the public vote. In addition to the competing entries, former Finnish Eurovision entrants performed as the interval acts in the semi-finals: Katri Helena (1979 and 1993) and Kirka (1984) in the first semi-final, Marion Rung (1962 and 1973) as well as Markku Aro and Koivisto Sisters (1971) in the second semi-final, Vicky Rosti (1987) and CatCat (1994) in the third semi-final, and Jarkko and Laura (1969) as well as Riki Sorsa (1981) in the fourth semi-final.

Final 
The final took place on 10 March 2006 at Hall 994 of the Holiday Club Caribia in Turku, hosted by Finnish presenters Jaana Pelkonen, Heikki Paasonen and Antero Mertaranta. The twelve entries that qualified from the preceding four semi-finals competed and the winner was selected over two rounds of public televoting. In the first round, the top six from the twelve competing entries qualified to the second round, the superfinal. In the superfinal, "Hard Rock Hallelujah" performed by Lordi was selected as the winner. A total of 213,050 votes were cast during the show: 54,554 in the final and 158,496 in the superfinal. In addition to the performances of the competing entries, the interval act featured 1976 Finnish Eurovision entrants Fredi and Friends as well as 2005 Finnish Eurovision entrant Geir Rönning.

At Eurovision
According to Eurovision rules, all nations with the exceptions of the host country, the "Big Four" (France, Germany, Spain and the United Kingdom) and the ten highest placed finishers in the 2005 contest are required to qualify from the semi-final on 18 May 2006 in order to compete for the final on 20 May 2006; the top ten countries from the semi-final progress to the final. On 21 March 2006, a special allocation draw was held which determined the running order for the semi-final and Finland was set to perform in position 16, following the entry from Ukraine and before the entry from the Netherlands. 

At the end of the semi-final, Finland was announced as having finished in the top 10 and subsequently qualifying for the grand final. This marked the first qualification to the final for Finland since the introduction of semi-finals in 2004. It was later revealed that Finland placed first in the semi-final, receiving a total of 292 points. The draw for the running order for the final was done by the presenters during the announcement of the ten qualifying countries during the semi-final and Finland was drawn to perform in position 17, following the entry from Greece and before the entry from Ukraine. Finland won the contest placing first with a score of 292 points. This was Finland's first victory in the Eurovision Song Contest since their first participation in 1961.

The semi-final and the final were televised in Finland on Yle TV2 with commentary in Finnish by Jaana Pelkonen, Heikki Paasonen and Asko Murtomäki. The three shows were also broadcast on Yle FST5 with commentary in Swedish by Thomas Lundin as well as via radio with Finnish commentary by Sanna Pirkkalainen and Jorma Hietamäki on Yle Radio Suomi. The Finnish spokesperson, who announced the Finnish votes during the final, was Nina Tapio.

Voting 
Below is a breakdown of points awarded to Finland and awarded by Finland in the semi-final and grand final of the contest. The nation awarded its 12 points to Bosnia and Herzegovina in the semi-final and to Russia in the final of the contest.

Points awarded to Finland

Points awarded by Finland

References

External links
  Full national final on Yle Elävä Arkisto

2006
Countries in the Eurovision Song Contest 2006
Eurovision
Eurovision